A cycling competition is held as part of the African Games.

Editions

Medal table 

NTB : The table is not complete.

External links

 
All-Africa Games